The 37th German Skeleton Championship 2002 was organized on 22 December 2002 in Winterberg.

Men

Women

External links 
 Resultlist at the BSD Site

Skeleton championships in Germany
2003 in German sport
2003 in skeleton